Chris Wiggins is an associate professor of applied mathematics at Columbia University. In 2010 he co-founded hackNY, a nonprofit organization focused on connecting students with startups in New York City. Since 2014, he has been the Chief Data Scientist at The New York Times.

Career 
In 2017, Chris Wiggins, along with Matthew Jones, introduced a new course to Columbia called "Data: Past, Present, Future". The course syllabus, lectures, labs, and resources are available online.

Notable Works 
 "ARACNE: an algorithm for the reconstruction of gene regulatory networks in a mammalian cellular context"

Awards 
In 2007, he received the Janette and Armen Avanessians Diversity Award at Columbia University.

Bibliography

References 

Year of birth missing (living people)
Living people
Data scientists
Princeton University alumni
The New York Times people
Columbia College (New York) alumni
Columbia University faculty